I Aithousa tou thronou (the throne room) is a Greek drama TV series, aired in the season 1998-99 by Mega Channel. It is based on the novel of Tasos Athanasiadis and it is directed by Pigi Dimitrakopoulou. The series was one of the most expensive production in the Greek television. It stars Aris Lempesopoulos, Maria Nafpliotou, Myrto Alikaki, Dimitris Lignadis. The series it was the last role of the important Greek actor Nikos Rizos. The scenes of series was shot in Syros and Attica. I Aithousa tou Thronou won the best Drama series award and the best director award, in the Greek television awards for the period 1998-99.

Plot
A son of a powerful family of a Greek island comes back from a monastery and decides to enter politics. On the island he meets the daughter of a Greek resistance fighter who died during the Greek resistance against German and Italian occupation. The two young people get to know each other and gradually fall in love.

Cast
Aris Lempesopoulos
Maria Naupliotou
Alekos Sissovitis
Myrto Alikaki
Alekos Sissovitis
Dimitris Lignadis
Nikos Rizos
Alekos Alexandrakis

References

External links

Mega Channel original programming
1998 Greek television series debuts
1999 Greek television series endings
1990s Greek television series